Northern Christian Radio, Inc is  a not-for-profit organization that operates non-commercial FM radio stations in Northern Michigan.  Northern Christian Radio is based in Gaylord, Michigan. Northern Christian Radio's studios are located on highway M-32 east of Gaylord.

In the early 1980s a group of Christian men began to explore the possibility of starting a Christian radio station for Northern Michigan.  Through their efforts, Northern Christian Radio, Incorporated was formed, and WPHN went on the air on Easter Sunday in 1985.

The Promise FM
Northern Christian Radio's main network changed its name from "Northern Christian Radio" to The Promise FM in November 2009.  The Promise FM programs a mix of Christian adult contemporary music. The Promise FM network includes WPHN in Gaylord, Michigan, WOLW in Cadillac, Michigan, WTHN in Sault Sainte Marie, Michigan, WQHN in East Jordan, Michigan, and two translators located in Petoskey, Michigan and Newberry, Michigan.  The Promise FM is a reporter to Radio and Records' Christian Soft AC/Inspirational playlist panel, reporting under the calls of WOLW, its station in Cadillac.

Sacred Favorites Radio
Sacred Favorites Radio was a network which aired traditional Christian Hymns as well as some Christian talk and teaching programs, such as Thru the Bible with J. Vernon McGee, Back to the Bible with Woodrow Kroll, and Grace to You with John MacArthur. The network is no longer in operation.

References

External links
The Promise FM

American radio networks
Contemporary Christian radio stations in the United States
Radio broadcasting companies of the United States
Religious mass media in the United States